Margaret Court and Judy Tegart-Dalton defeated Rosie Casals and Billie Jean King 6–4, 6–4 in the final to win the women's doubles title at the 1969 Australian Open.

Seeds

  Rosie Casals /  Billie Jean King (final)
  Margaret Court /  Judy Tegart-Dalton (champions)
  Karen Krantzcke /  Kerry Melville (semifinals)
  Françoise Dürr /  Ann Jones (semifinals)

Draw

Full draw

References

External links
 1969 Australian Open – Women's draws and results at the International Tennis Federation

Women's Doubles
Australian Open (tennis) by year – Women's doubles
1969 in Australian women's sport
1969 in women's tennis